The Rural Municipality of McCreary is a former rural municipality (RM) in the Canadian province of Manitoba. It was originally incorporated as a rural municipality on May 1, 1909. It ceased on January 1, 2015 as a result of its provincially mandated amalgamation with the Village of McCreary to form the Municipality of McCreary.

Communities 
 Glencairn
 Norgate
 Reeve

References 

 Manitoba Historical Society - Rural Municipality of McCreary
 Map of McCreary R.M. at Statcan

External links 
 

McCreary
Populated places disestablished in 2015
2015 disestablishments in Manitoba